The following list of Restoration candidates itemises all 72 of the buildings at risk featured in the BBC TV series Restoration. The series was aired over three seasons in 2003, 2004 and 2006 with the aim of publicising and saving severely neglected buildings of heritage importance throughout the United Kingdom.

First series (2003)

North West England (aired 8 August)
Bank Hall – Bretherton, near Chorley, Lancashire – Most popular regional runner-up Brackenhill Tower – Longtown, near CarlisleVictoria Baths – Manchester  – Finalist > Winner

East of England (aired 12 August)
Coalhouse Fort – East Tilbury, EssexMoulton Windmill – Moulton, near Spalding, LincolnshireGreyfriars Tower – King's Lynn, Norfolk – Finalist

Scottish Lowlands (aired 15 August)
Britannia Music Hall – GlasgowNairn's Linoleum Works – Kirkcaldy, FifeMavisbank House – Dalkeith, Midlothian – Finalist

South West England (aired 19 August)
Poltimore House – Poltimore, near Exeter – FinalistArnos Vale Cemetery – BristolWhitefield's Tabernacle – Kingswood, near Bristol

Northern Ireland (aired 22 August)
Lissan House – Cookstown, County Tyrone – Finalist > Second placeHerdmans Mill – Sion Mills, near Strabane, County TyroneThe Crescent Arts Centre – Belfast

English Midlands (aired 26 August)
Newman Brothers Coffin Factory – BirminghamCromford Mill – Cromford, near Matlock, DerbyshireBethesda Chapel – Stoke-on-Trent – Finalist

Scottish Highlands (aired 29 August)
Kinloch Castle – Rùm – FinalistEasthouse Croft – Duncansclate (or Duncansclett), Burra, ShetlandGlen O'Dee Sanitorium – Banchory, Aberdeenshire

North East England (aired 2 September)
Ravensworth Castle – GatesheadHarperley Prisoner-of-War Camp – near Crook, County DurhamConservatory and Folly Castle at Wentworth Castle – near Barnsley, South Yorkshire – Finalist > Third place

Wales (aired 5 September)
Faenol Old Hall – Y Faenol (English spelling: Vaynol), near Bangor, GwyneddAmlwch Port and Parys Mountain – Amlwch, AngleseyLlanelly House – Llanelli, Carmarthenshire – Finalist

South East England (aired 9 September)
Broomfield House – Palmers Green, London Wilton's Music Hall – Tower Hamlets, London – FinalistDarnley Mausoleum – Cobham, Kent

Second series (2004)

Scotland (aired 13 July)
Portencross Castle – near West Kilbride, AyrshireHall of Clestrain – Orphir, OrkneyKnockando Wool Mill – Knockando, Aberlour, Moray – Finalist

England: South East (aired 18 July)
Archbishop's Palace – Charing, Kent – FinalistWalpole's villa, Strawberry Hill – Twickenham, LondonSeverndroog Castle – Greenwich, London

Wales (aired 20 July)
Cardigan Castle and Castle Green House – Cardigan, CeredigionLlanfyllin Union Workhouse – Llanfyllin, PowysCelynen Collieries' Workingmen's Institute and Memorial Hall – Newbridge, Caerphilly – Finalist > Second place

England: South West (aired 25 July)
Sherborne House, Dorset – Sherborne, Dorset – FinalistCastle House – Bridgwater, SomersetSouth Caradon Mine – Caradon Hill, near Liskeard, Cornwall

England: North (aired 27 July)
Sheffield Manor Lodge – SheffieldGayle Mill – Gayle, near Hawes, North Yorkshire – Finalist > Third placeLion Salt Works – Northwich, Cheshire

Northern Ireland (aired 1 August)
Armagh Gaol – ArmaghLock-Keepers Cottage – Newforge, BelfastDerry Playhouse – Derry – Finalist

England: Midlands and East Anglia (aired 3 August)
Newstead Abbey – Ravenshead, NottinghamshireOld Grammar School and Saracen's Head (now St Nicolas Place) – King's Norton, Birmingham – Finalist > WinnerBawdsey Radar Station – Bawdsey, Suffolk – Most popular regional runner-up > Finalist

Third series "Restoration Village" (2006)

1. England: South East
Woodrolfe Granary – Tollesbury, EssexMassey's Folly – Farringdon, HampshireWatts Gallery – Compton, Surrey – Finalist > Second place

2. England: South West
The Barton – Welcombe, Torridge, DevonDawe's Twine Works – West Coker, SomersetTrinity Methodist Chapel – Newlyn, Cornwall – Finalist

3. England: Midlands and East Anglia
All Saints Church – Beckingham, LincolnshirePennoyer's School – Pulham St Mary, NorfolkChedham's Yard – Wellesbourne, Warwickshire – Finalist > Winner

4. Scotland
Dennis Head Old Beacon – North Ronaldsay, Orkney – Finalist > Third PlaceGreenlaw Town Hall – Greenlaw, BerwickshireCromarty East Church – Cromarty, Highland – Most popular regional runner-up > Finalist

5. Wales
Pembrey Court (now Court Farm) – Pembrey, CarmarthenshirePen-yr-Orsedd Quarry – Nantlle, Gwynedd – FinalistPrichard Jones Institute – Newborough, Anglesey

6. Northern Ireland
Gracehill Old Primary School – Gracehill, County AntrimCushendun Old Church – Cushendun, County Antrim – FinalistThe White House – Newtownabbey, County Antrim

7. England: North
Howsham Mill – Howsham, North Yorkshire – FinalistHigherford Mill – Higherford, near Nelson, LancashireHeugh Gun Battery – Hartlepool, County Durham

Notes

External links
BBC website - 2003 series list
BBC website - 2004 series list
BBC website - 2006 series list

Buildings and structures in the United Kingdom
Restoration candidates
Listed buildings in the United Kingdom